Duke of Argyll is a title created in the peerage of Scotland in 1701 and in the peerage of the United Kingdom in 1892. The earls, marquesses, and dukes of Argyll were for several centuries among the most powerful noble families in Scotland.  As such, they played a major role in Scottish history throughout the 16th, 17th, and 18th centuries. The Duke of Argyll also holds the hereditary titles of chief of Clan Campbell and Master of the Household of Scotland.

Since 2001, Torquhil Campbell has been Duke of Argyll and is the thirteenth man to hold the title.

History
Sir Colin Campbell of Lochow was knighted in 1280. In 1445 James II of Scotland raised Sir Colin's descendant Sir Duncan Campbell to the peerage to become Duncan Campbell of Lochow, Lord of Argyll, Knight, 1st Lord Campbell. Colin Campbell (c. 1433–1493) succeeded his grandfather as the 2nd Lord Campbell in 1453 and was created Earl of Argyll in 1457.

The 8th Earl of Argyll was created a marquess in 1641, when Charles I visited Scotland and attempted to quell the rising political crisis (and the fall-out from the event known as The Incident). With Oliver Cromwell's victory in England, the marquess became the effective ruler of Scotland. Upon the restoration, the marquess offered his services to King Charles II but was charged with treason and executed in 1661. His lands and titles were forfeited but in 1663, they were restored to his son, Archibald, who became the 9th Earl of Argyll. In 1685 the 9th Earl was executed for his part in the Monmouth rebellion.

On 21 June 1701 the 9th Earl's son was created Duke of Argyll, Marquess of Kintyre and Lorne, Earl of Campbell and Cowal, Viscount of Lochow and Glenyla, Lord Inveraray, Mull, Morvern, and Tiree for his services to William of Orange. His son, the 2nd Duke, was created Baron Chatham and Earl of Greenwich in 1705 as a reward for his support for the Act of Union and further elevated to the title Duke of Greenwich in 1719. Upon his death his Scottish titles passed to his brother and the English titles became extinct.

The 5th Duke sat as a member of parliament for Glasgow Burghs until his father's accession to the Dukedom in 1761 disqualified him from representing a Scottish seat. He then became the member for Dover until 1766, when he was created Baron Sundridge and obtained the right to sit in the House of Lords.

On 17 April 1892, the 8th Duke was created Duke of Argyll in the Peerage of the United Kingdom. Thus, the Duke is one of only five people to hold two or more different dukedoms, the others being the Duke of Cornwall and Rothesay, the Duke of Buccleuch and Queensberry, the Duke of Hamilton and Brandon, and the Duke of Richmond, Lennox, and Gordon.

During the 19th century, a distant Prussian descendant of the family, Jenny von Westphalen, became the wife of the philosopher Karl Marx. In a famous story, when exiled to Paris and reduced to poverty, Marx was nearly arrested for attempting to pawn a part of Jenny's dowry: a silver dinner service bearing the crest of the House of Argyll. Of the incident Marx wrote to Engels, possibly in an attempt to solicit another loan from his wealthy friend: "My wife cried all night". However, the silver was eventually sold to pay off long-standing debts incurred by the Neue Rheinische Zeitung.

In the late 19th century the then current Duke of Argyll visited America. While there, he stayed at the American Hotel situated in the main square of the village of Babylon, New York. The townspeople took a liking to the duke, and festivals and parades took place while he visited there. Just before the turn of the century (1900) the township of Babylon renamed the Bythbourne Lake/Park to Argyle Lake/Park (Argyll evolved to the currently accepted Argyle) in memory of the duke's visit.

Family seats and abodes

The family seat is Inveraray Castle beside Loch Fyne, Inveraray, Argyll. The estate, 75,000 acres, is a mixture of commercial forestry, residential property, sources of renewable energy, and a caravan park.

The principal burial place of the Dukes and Duchesses is St Munn's Parish Church, Kilmun. The 11th and the 12th Dukes chose to be buried on the island of Inishail in Loch Awe.

In 1706 John Campbell, second Duke of Argyll, became the inhabitant of a house on the east side of King Street, St James (Soho end), Westminster, London which stood on a site occupied by the western end of Little Argyll Street which in 1735 or 1736 he vacated for redevelopment.  A succession of Argyll Houses followed in the same block of streets   In 1808 the 6th Duke sold the latter-day House to the 4th Earl of Aberdeen.

In and before 1764 the family had a house near to London at Ham which was then in the county of Surrey, a parish historically associated with Richmond, and a nearby second holding, see map above left.

Subsidiary titles
The Duke holds several subsidiary titles, including: Marquess of Kintyre and Lorne (created 1701), Earl of Argyll (created 1457), Earl Campbell and Cowall and Viscount Lochow and Glenyla (created 1701), Lord Campbell (created 1445), Lord Lorne (created 1470), Lord Kintyre (created 1626), Lord Inveraray, Mull, Mover and Tiry (created 1701), Baron Hamilton of Hameldon (created 1776) and Baron Sundridge (created 1766). They are in the Peerage of Scotland, except the last two, which are in the Peerage of Great Britain. The Duke is also a Baronet of Lundie (created 1627) in the Baronetage of Nova Scotia. The courtesy title for the Duke's eldest son and heir is Marquess of Lorne, shortened from Marquess of Kintyre and Lorne.

Hereditary offices
Hereditary Master of the Royal Household in Scotland 
 Hereditary High Justiciar of Argyll
Admiral of the Western Coasts and Isles
Hereditary Keeper of the Royal Castles of: Carrick, Dunoon, Dunstaffnage, Tarbert
Hereditary High Sheriff of Argyllshire
Member Queen's Body Guard for Scotland

The Duke of Argyll is also the chief of the Scottish clan of Campbell and in this capacity is known as "MacCailein Mòr", which is Gaelic, for "The Great MacColin" referring to Cailean Mór (Colin the Great) of Lochawe (Colin of Lochow) who was killed in fighting with Alexander, Lord of Lorne in 1296.

Since James IV's reign, the Duke has also held the position of Master of the Household of Scotland.

Coat of arms
The heraldic blazon for the coat of arms of the dukedom is: Quarterly: 1st and 4th gyronny of eight or and sable (for Campbell); 2nd and 3rd argent, a lymphad, sails furled and oars in action sable, flags and pennants flying gules (for Lorne).

List of title holders

Lords Campbell (1445)
Duncan Campbell, 1st Lord Campbell (d. 1453)
Archibald Campbell, Master of Campbell (d. c. 1431–1440) (eldest son of the 1st Lord, died before his father was created a Lord of Parliament)
Colin Campbell, 2nd Lord Campbell (c. 1433–1493) (created Earl of Argyll in 1457)

Earls of Argyll (1457)
Colin Campbell, 1st Earl of Argyll (c. 1433–1493) (only son of the Master)
Archibald Campbell, 2nd Earl of Argyll (d. 1513) (eldest son of the 1st Earl)
Colin Campbell, 3rd Earl of Argyll (c. 1486–1529) (eldest son of the 2nd Earl)
Archibald Campbell, 4th Earl of Argyll (c. 1507–1558) (only son of the 3rd Earl)
Archibald Campbell, 5th Earl of Argyll (c. 1537–1573) (elder son of the 4th Earl, died without issue)
Colin Campbell, 6th Earl of Argyll (c. 1541/1546–1584) (younger son of the 4th Earl)
Archibald Campbell, 7th Earl of Argyll (c. 1576–1638) (elder son of the 6th Earl)
Archibald Campbell, 8th Earl of Argyll (1607–1661) (created Marquess of Argyll in 1641)

Marquesses of Argyll (1641)
Archibald Campbell, 1st Marquess of Argyll (1607–1661) (elder son of the 7th Earl, was tried for high treason, attainted and all his honours forfeit in 1661)

Earls of Argyll (1457; restored 1663)
Archibald Campbell, 9th Earl of Argyll (c. 1629–1685) (elder son of the 1st Marquess, was restored in 1663 to his father's honours, excepting his Marquessate. He was later tried for high treason and all his honours forfeit in 1681)
Archibald Campbell, 10th Earl of Argyll (1658–1703) (Elder son of the 9th Earl, restored to his father's honours in 1685, created Duke of Argyll in 1701)

Dukes of Argyll (1701)
Archibald Campbell, 1st Duke of Argyll (1658–1703) (eldest son of the 9th Earl, was restored to his father's honours in 1685)
John Campbell, 2nd Duke of Argyll, 1st Duke of Greenwich (1680–1743) (eldest son of the 1st Duke, died without male issue)
Archibald Campbell, 3rd Duke of Argyll (1682–1761) (second and youngest son of the 1st Duke, died without legitimate issue)
John Campbell, 4th Duke of Argyll (1693–1770) (eldest son of John Campbell, second son of the 9th Earl and younger brother of the 1st Duke)
John Campbell, 5th Duke of Argyll (1723–1806) (elder/est son of the 4th Duke)
George John Campbell, Earl of Campbell (1763–1764) (eldest son of the 5th Duke, died in infancy)
George William Campbell, 6th Duke of Argyll (1768–1839) (second son of the 5th Duke, died without issue)
John Douglas Edward Henry Campbell, 7th Duke of Argyll (1777–1847) (third and youngest son of the 5th Duke)
John Henry Campbell (1821–1837) (eldest son of the 7th Duke, died young)
George John Douglas Campbell, 8th Duke of Argyll (1823–1900) (second and younger son of the 7th Duke, created Duke of Argyll in the Peerage of the United Kingdom in 1892)
John George Edward Henry Douglas Sutherland Campbell, 9th Duke of Argyll (S) and 2nd Duke of Argyll (UK) (1845–1914) (eldest son of the 8th Duke, married The Princess Louise, daughter of Queen Victoria, but died without issue)
Niall Diarmid Campbell, 10th Duke of Argyll (S) and 3rd Duke of Argyll (UK) (1872–1949) (only son of Lord Archibald Campbell, second son of the 8th Duke, died unmarried)
Ian Douglas Campbell, 11th Duke of Argyll (S) and 4th Duke of Argyll (UK) (1903–1973) (grandson of Lord Walter Campbell, third son of the 8th Duke)
Ian Campbell, 12th Duke of Argyll (S) and 5th Duke of Argyll (UK) (1937–2001) (eldest son of the 11th Duke)
Torquhil Ian Campbell, 13th Duke of Argyll (S) and 6th Duke of Argyll (UK) (b. 1968) (only son of the 12th Duke)

The heir apparent is the present holder's eldest son, Archibald Frederick Campbell, Marquess of Lorne (b. 2004).

Lords Kintyre (1626)
James Campbell, 1st Earl of Irvine, 1st Lord Kintyre (1626–1645)
Archibald Campbell, 1st Marquess of Argyll, 2nd Lord Kintyre (1607–1661)
For further succession see above

Campbell baronets, of Lundie (1627)
Colin Campbell, 1st Baronet (b. 1599) (only son of the younger son of the 6th Earl)
Colin Campbell, 2nd Baronet (d. 1696) (only son of the 1st Baronet, died without issue)
Archibald Campbell, 1st Duke of Argyll (1658–1703)
For further succession see above

Family tree

Current line of succession

  Ian Campbell, 11th Duke of Argyll (1903-1973)
  Ian Campbell, 12th Duke of Argyll (1937-2001)
  Torquhil Campbell, 13th Duke of Argyll (b. 1968)
 (1) Archibald Friedrich Campbell, Marquess of Lorne (b. 2004), known as Archie Lorne
 (2) Lord Rory James Campbell (b. 2006) 
 (3) Lord Colin Ivar Campbell (b. 1946)

See also 
Princess Louise, Duchess of Argyll (1848–1939), wife of the 9th Duke
Margaret, Duchess of Argyll (1912–1993), wife of the 11th Duke
Earl Cawdor
Clan Campbell
Duke of Argyll's Tea Tree

References

Further reading

External links
Clan Campbell Society (North America)
Duke of Argyll (archived)
 1st Hamrun Scout Group — Duke of Argyll's Own

Literary references
The 2nd duke features prominently in novel The Heart of Midlothian by Sir Walter Scott

Dukedoms in the Peerage of Scotland
1701 establishments in Scotland
1892 establishments in the United Kingdom
Noble titles created in 1701
Noble titles created in 1892
People associated with Argyll and Bute
Dukedoms in the Peerage of the United Kingdom
 
British landowners